Fairfield is an unincorporated community and census-designated place (CDP) in Rockbridge County, Virginia, United States. As of the 2020 census, it had a population of 257.

The CDP is in the northeast part of the county, along U.S. Route 11 (North Lee Highway), which leads northeast  to Greenville and southwest  to Lexington. Interstate 81/64 forms the northwest edge of the community, with access from Exit 200 (Sterrett Road). The Interstate highway runs parallel to US 11 and leads northeast  to Staunton and southwest  to where the highways split near Lexington.

Geography
Fairfield is drained by Marlbrook Creek, which flows southeast to the South River, a southwest-flowing tributary of the Maury River and part of the James River watershed.

It lies at an elevation of 1,588 feet.

References 

Populated places in Rockbridge County, Virginia
Census-designated places in Rockbridge County, Virginia
Census-designated places in Virginia